The Killer Rabbit of Caerbannog is a fictional character in the Monty Python film Monty Python and the Holy Grail. The scene in Holy Grail was written by Graham Chapman and John Cleese. The rabbit is the antagonist in a major set piece battle, and makes a similar appearance in Spamalot, a musical inspired by the movie. The iconic status of this scene was important in establishing the viability of the musical.

In the film 
The Cave of Caerbannog is the home of the Legendary Black Beast of Arrrghhh. This is guarded by a monster which is initially unknown. King Arthur (Graham Chapman) and his knights are led to the cave by Tim the Enchanter (John Cleese) and find that they must face its guardian beast. Tim verbally paints a picture of a monster so terrible as to have killed everyone who has tried to enter the cave, and warns them, "death awaits you all—with nasty, big, pointy teeth!". As the knights approach the cave and the rabbit, their "horses" become nervous, forcing the knights to dismount. Despite the cave's entrance being surrounded by the bones of "full fifty men" fallen, Arthur and his knights no longer take it seriously. Ignoring Tim's warnings ("a vicious streak a mile wide!"), King Arthur orders Bors (Terry Gilliam) to chop the rabbit's head off. Bors draws his sword and confidently approaches it. The rabbit suddenly leaps at least eight feet directly at Sir Bors' neck and bites clean through it in a single motion, decapitating him to the sound of a can opener. Despite their initial shock, and the sounds of Tim's loud laughter, the knights attack in force, but the rabbit injures several of the knights and kills Gawain and Ector with ease. The knights themselves have no hope of killing or injuring the rabbit. Arthur panics and shouts for the knights to retreat ("Run away!"). Sir Galahad asks if taunting the rabbit could cause it to make a mistake, Sir Robin asks if running away "more" would confuse it, and Sir Lancelot suggest bows. Knowing they cannot risk attacking again, they try to find another way to defeat the beast. The Holy Hand Grenade of Antioch is ultimately used to kill the rabbit, and allow the quest to proceed.

Holy Hand Grenade of Antioch 

The Holy Hand Grenade of Antioch is a visual satire of the Sovereign's Orb of the United Kingdom, and may refer to the mythical Holy Spear of Antioch. The Holy Hand Grenade is described as one of the "sacred relics" carried by Brother Maynard (Eric Idle). Despite its ornate appearance and long-winded instructions, it functions much the same as any other hand grenade. At King Arthur's prompting, instructions for its use are read aloud (by Michael Palin) from the fictitious Book of Armaments, Chapter 2, verses 9–21, parodying the King James Bible and the Athanasian Creed:

Arthur then pulls the pin, holds up the Holy Hand Grenade and cries out "One! Two! Five!" Sir Galahad (Palin) corrects him: "Three, sir!" (Arthur's innumeracy is a running gag in the picture). Arthur then yells "Three!" and hurls the grenade towards the rabbit. The grenade soars through the air—accompanied by a short bit of angelic choral a cappella—bounces, and explodes. The killer rabbit is defeated, and the hapless knights errant continue on their quest. The noise also attracts policemen who were investigating the murder of a historian by a mounted knight earlier in the film.

Production 

The rabbit scene was shot outside the Tomnadashan mine, a cave  from the Perthshire village of Killin. For the 25th-anniversary DVD, Michael Palin and Terry Jones returned to be interviewed in front of the cave but they could not remember the location.

The rabbit was portrayed in the movie by both a real rabbit and a puppet.

The name "Caerbannog", though fictitious, does reference real-world Welsh naming traditions: the element caer means 'castle', as in Caerdydd (Cardiff) and Caerphilly, and bannog can have a variety of meanings, the most apposite here being "turreted".

Antecedents 

The tale of the rabbit has a parallel in the early story of the Roman de Renart in which a foe takes hubristic pride in his defeat of a ferocious hare:

The idea for the rabbit in the movie was taken from the façade of the cathedral of Notre Dame de Paris. This illustrates the weakness of cowardice by showing a knight fleeing from a rabbit.

Merchandise 
The rabbit has been reproduced in the form of merchandise associated with the movie or musical. Such items include cuddly toys, slippers and staplers. The plush killer rabbit was rated the second-geekiest plush toy of all time by Matt Blum of the GeekDad blog on Wired.com, coming second to the plush Cthulhu.

Reception 
The rabbit was declared the top movie bunny by David Cheal in The Daily Telegraph. It also ranked high in an Easter 2008 poll to establish Britain's best movie rabbit, coming third to Roger Rabbit and Frank from Donnie Darko.

In popular culture 
The rabbit is sometimes used as a metaphor for something which seems ostensibly harmless but is, in fact, deadly. Such hidden but real risks may even arise from similarly cuddly animals. The humour of the scene comes from this inversion of the usual framework by which safety and danger are judged. Four years after the release of the movie, Killer Rabbit was the term used widely by the press to describe the swamp rabbit that "attacked" then U.S. President Jimmy Carter while he was fishing on a farm pond.

Video games
In the sandbox game Minecraft, there is a command that players can run that will spawn in the killer rabbit, or, as it is called in the game, "The Killer Bunny". It is white with red eyes and attacks the player, foxes and wolves, unlike normal rabbits in the game.
In the MMORPG Old School RuneScape there is a hidden boss called simply 'Rabbit'. Although it has the same combat level as normal rabbits in the area, the boss version has much higher statistics including an incredibly high hitpoints level. In reference to Monty Python the Rabbit drops a grail when defeated.
In the game Hardspace: Shipbreaker there is an achievement for collecting a stuffed toy, called "Captured Killer of Caerbannog".

Technology
In Apple Inc.'s iOS system, Siri may say that the "Rabbit of Caerbannog" is its favourite animal when asked.
When a Tesla Model 3 is named "the rabbit of Caerbannog" a link to the Monty Python YouTube channel in the Tesla Theatre will appear.

Miscellaneous
Creatures & Treasures, a sourcebook for Iron Crown Enterprises' Rolemaster tabletop role-playing game, includes a "Killer Rabbit" monster entry. The creature's outlook is given as "Hostile", with a note that it "bounds for the throat, never for another part of the body." Another note in the description instructs the gamemaster to "treat 'exploding' attacks [made against the rabbit] as 'slaying' (H.H.G.O.A.)", a clear reference to the Holy Hand Grenade of Antioch.

See also 

 Jimmy Carter rabbit incident
 Killer Bunnies and the Quest for the Magic Carrot
 Killer Bunnies (dance project)
 Night of the Lepus
 Wallace & Gromit: The Curse of the Were-Rabbit

References 

Film characters introduced in 1975
Fictional monsters
Fictional rabbits and hares
Fictional rampage and spree killers
Monty Python and the Holy Grail
Comedy film characters
Musical theatre characters
Monty Python characters